Hájek is a municipality and village in Karlovy Vary District in the Karlovy Vary Region of the Czech Republic. It has about 600 inhabitants.

Administrative parts
The village of Nová Víska is an administrative part of Hájek.

References

Villages in Karlovy Vary District